All The Great Love Songs is an album by Commodores, released in 1984.

Track listing
"Sweet Love"
"Just to Be Close to You"
"Easy"
"Three Times a Lady"
"Say Yeah"
"Still"
"Loving You"
"Sail On"
"Old Fashioned Love"
"Jesus Is Love"
"Lady (You Bring Me Up)"
"Oh No"
"This Love"
"Lucy"

External links

1984 compilation albums